The Moviegoer  is the seventh studio album by the American solo artist Scott Walker. It was released in October 1972 but failed to chart. No singles were released from the album, though "This Way Mary" was later released as a b-side to Walker's 1973 single "The Me I Never Knew". The album consists solely of renditions of film theme songs originally performed by other artists.

The album was the first of six studio albums (the last two as The Walker Brothers) in which Walker did not contribute original material. Having lost creative control of his music after the commercial failures of his previous two studio albums Scott 4 and 'Til the Band Comes In, Walker was tasked with recording "inoffensive, middle-of-the-road material that could be easily processed, marketed and sold". By way of compromise Walker had some say in the song selection and drew together a selection of themes from some of his favourite films.

The album was recorded quickly in the summer of 1972 with Walker's usual studio team consisting of producer Johnny Franz and engineer Peter J. Olliff. In a change from previous work, Robert Cornford was brought-in to produce the orchestral arrangements. Despite a push for commercial viability the album received negative reviews when released as an LP in October 1972. The album was re-issued in 1975 by Contour record label with new sleeve art. The album has since been deleted and has not been reissued.

Availability
The continued unavailability of The Moviegoer is believed to be due to Walker's dissatisfaction with his albums from the period, which he describes in the documentary Scott Walker: 30 Century Man as his "wilderness years". Walker has blocked CD re-releases of The Moviegoer, Scott: Scott Walker Sings Songs from his TV Series (1969) and Any Day Now (1973).

In spite of the albums deletion, the majority of the songs were released in recent years on the expansive 5 Easy Pieces (2003) boxset and Classics & Collectibles (2005). "Glory Road", "The Summer Knows", and "The Ballad of Sacco and Vanzetti" are included on the 5 Easy Pieces (2003) boxset while "Loss Of Love", "Come Saturday Morning", "That Night", "This Way Mary", "A Face In The Crowd", "Speak Softly Love", "Easy Come Easy Go" can only be purchased on the compilation Classics & Collectibles. Only "Joe Hill" and "All His Children" remain unavailable.

Reception

In common with Walker's 1970s output, The Moviegoer was poorly received by critics but has been reassessed since Walker was critically reappraised in the decades following The Walker Brothers' 1978 album Nite Flights. In their Walker biography A Deep Shade of Blue, Mike Watkinson and Pete Anderson recommend the album to only the most die-hard of Scott Walker fans, but cite "The Ballad of Sacco and Vanzetti" as the album's undoubted highlight for its Spaghetti-Western feel vaguely reminiscent of "The Seventh Seal" from Scott 4.

Stephen Thomas Erlewine writing retrospectively for Allmusic summarises The Moviegoer as a "harmless mainstream pop album [delivered] without much care".

Track listing

Personnel
 Scott Walker – Vocals
 Johnny Franz – Producer
 Peter J. Olliff – Engineering
 Robert Cornford – Orchestra director

Release history

References

Scott Walker (singer) albums
1972 albums
Philips Records albums
Albums produced by Johnny Franz